BTCC (known as BTCChina until 2015) is a crypto exchange established in June 2011. The exchange underwent a significant restructuring in 2018, closing its offices in China and expanding its business globally since then.

History 
BTCC was founded in June 2011. BTCC now stands for 'BTC & Crypto', as stated on the company's official website, although it used to mean 'BTC China'.

Former company CEO Bobby C. Lee approached the then two-person company in early 2013, and after investing his own money and attracting investors, oversaw the company's rapid expansion and market share growth by the end of the year. The Stanford computer science graduate, whose brother Charlie founded the cryptocurrency Litecoin, previously worked for Yahoo! in the United States, and as vice president of technology for Walmart China.

In November 2013, BTCChina raised $5 million in Series A funding from investors, Lightspeed China Partners, and Lightspeed Venture Partners.

On 18 December 2013, BTCChina announced that it was temporarily suspending acceptance of Chinese Yuan deposits, attributing the decision to government regulations, following a December statement from the People's Bank of China (PBOC). On 30 January 2014, the exchange resumed accepting yuan deposits, after further studying the PBOC statement and other rules. While the PBOC prohibited banks from trading in Bitcoin, BTCChina explained that they were accepting Yuan into their corporate bank account, and transferring that money to their customer accounts, before it was traded for bitcoins.

In September 2017, BTCC announced it would cease all trading, reacting to Chinese authorities banning initial coin offerings (ICOs) one week prior. Later in January 2018, BTCC was acquired by an unnamed Hong Kong-based blockchain investment fund with the intent to move its operations out of China.

In 2018, BTCC reorganized and established multilingual regional businesses such as Taiwan, Japan, and South Korea. Localized language revisions were released at the same time. However, on August 18, 2022, it was reported that BTCC was among 16 foreign cryptocurrency businesses that lacked the proper registration to operate in South Korea. An intelligence unit of the Financial Services Commission reported the businesses to the nation’s investigative body and asked other agencies to block access to the firms’ local websites.

As of December 2022, the exchange provides USDT-margined and coin-margined futures trading on more than 50 highly-liquid cryptocurrencies, including BTC, ETH, DOGE, and more, with a leverage of up to 150x. The exchange's 24-hour trading volume is over $12 billion, ranked 3rd in the derivative exchanges on CoinGecko.

References

External links 
 

Bitcoin exchanges
Chinese companies established in 2011